At least two warships of Japan have been named Minegumo:

, an  launched in 1937 and sunk in 1943.
, a  launched in 1967 and struck in 1999.

Japanese Navy ship names